The Hunter 31 is an American sailboat, designed by Cortland Steck and first built in 1983.

In 2006 the company introduced a new boat under the same Hunter 31 name, but it is commonly referred to as the Hunter 31-2 or Hunter 30/31 to differentiate it from this design. It is sometimes confused with the 2015 Marlow-Hunter 31.

Production
The Hunter 31 was built by Hunter Marine in the United States between 1983 and 1987, but it is now out of production.

Design
The Hunter 31 is a small recreational keelboat, built predominantly of fiberglass, with wood trim.

The full keel boat has a PHRF racing average handicap of 168 with a high of 174 and low of 162. The shoal keel version has a PHRF racing average handicap of 171 with a high of 180 and low of 162.

See also
List of sailing boat types

Similar sailboats
Allmand 31
Beneteau 31
Catalina 310
Corvette 31
Douglas 31
Herreshoff 31
Hunter 310
Hunter 320
Marlow-Hunter 31
Niagara 31
Roue 20
Tanzer 31

References

External links
Official 1983 Hunter 31 sales brochure

Keelboats
1980s sailboat type designs
Sailing yachts
Sailboat types built by Hunter Marine
Sailboat type designs by Cortland Steck